Moyne Aerodrome was an aerodrome situated north east of Thurles, County Tipperary in Ireland. As of 2008, it was one of only two official aerodromes in County Tipperary.

From the air, this Aerodrome is difficult to find, as there is nothing remarkable that stands out in the vicinity of the airfield. There is a large factory building about 1 km west of the field which may be the best landmark for the airfield. Features include a small hangar in the northwest corner of the field and a small windsock about 100 metres into the field from the threshold of runway 20.  Overhead power cables on the approach to runway 20 should be considered when approaching.

See also
 Aerodromes of Ireland

References

Airports in the Republic of Ireland
Transport in County Tipperary